Fizruk is a Russian situation comedy television series. The first run started on 7 April 2014.

Plot 
This is a story about the collision of two times: the "dashing" 90s and the "stable" tenths. The main character Foma has been the "right hand" of an influential person with a semi-criminal past all his life. When the "owner" kicked him out of retirement, Foma decided to return back in any way. At first it seemed that everything would be simple: get close to the child of the former boss, bend over, remind yourself of yourself and return to business. But Thomas' plan collapses on the first day. He has to stay at school for a long time. Once in a completely unfamiliar world of children and teachers, which is radically different from his usual circle, Foma not only changes his life, but also changes himself.

Cast 
 Dmitry Nagiyev as Foma
 Anastasiya Panina as Tatyana Chernyshova
 Vladimir Sychyov as Psikh
 Alexander Gordon as Mamay
 Viktor Sukhorukov as Ernest Shilovsky
 Sofya Rayzman as Sofya
 Daniil Muravyov-Izotov as Petya
 Aleksandr Yakin as Sanya
 Georgy Kudrenko as Vitalik
 Yelena Muravyova as Lukovka
 Karina Mishulina as Svetlana Yermakova
 Yevgeny Kulakov as Truslivy lev
 Roman Indyk as Albert Moiseyevich
 Natalya Korennaya as Olga Timofeyevna
 Yekaterina Lisovaya as Vera Ivanovna
 Sergey Plaksin as Georgy Kuzmich
 Daniil Vakhrushev as Valya
 Artur Sopelnik as Borzy
 Viktoriya Klinkova as Pupok
 Andrey Kryzhny as Banan
 Sergey Zhuravlyov as Minus
 Dmitry Gogu as Oduvan
 Varvara Bogdanova as Cheburashka
 Yan Tsapnik as Khromulya
 Yekaterina Melnik as Belka

References

External links 
 

Russian television sitcoms
2014 Russian television series debuts
TNT (Russian TV channel) original programming